Rackham (later, Rackham Entertainment) was a French miniature and role-playing games production company founded in 1997 by Jean Bey, CEO and Creative Director. At its peak, Rackham had over 70 employees, including designers, illustrators, writers, sculptors, painters, and foundry-workers, and were managed by Jean Bey until November 2008. Following the transformation to Rackham Entertainment, Jean Bey retained only his Art Director position and the management of the Sentinel program.

The company's main product was the miniature wargame Confrontation, which was translated into five languages and marketed in 41 countries. In 2006 Rackham published the role-playing game Cadwallon set in the world of Confrontation. Also in 2006, Rackham released a sci-fi squad level wargame called AT-43. Rackham has also released a board game called Hybrid.

Beginning in July 2005, Rackham was listed on the Euronext stock market. In October 2008, Rackham re-emerged as Rackham Entertainment. In October 2010, Rackham Entertainment Company began liquidation and is now dissolved.

References

External links 
 Archive of Rackham content and products

Game manufacturers
Role-playing game publishing companies
Publishing companies established in 1997